Bidheshwor Prasad Yadav is a Nepalese politician who is elected member of Provincial Assembly of Madhesh Province from People's Socialist Party, Nepal. Yadav, a resident of Dakneshwori Municipality, Saptari was elected to the 2017 provincial assembly election from Saptari 3(B).

Electoral history

2017 Nepalese provincial elections

References

Living people
Members of the Provincial Assembly of Madhesh Province
Madhesi people
People from Saptari District
People's Socialist Party, Nepal politicians
1980 births